The 2023 24H GT Series powered by Hankook is the ninth season of the 24H Series with drivers battling for championship points and titles and the fourteenth season since Creventic, the organiser and promoter of the series, organises multiple races a year. The races are contested with GT3-spec cars, GT4-spec cars, sports cars and 24H-Specials, like silhouette cars.

Calendar

Teams and drivers

References

Notes

External links

24H GT Series
2023 in 24H Series
24H GT Series